E181 may refer to:
 Tannic acid
 Tetraethylene glycol dimethyl ether